Walker is a new neighbourhood in south east Edmonton, Alberta, Canada. It is bounded on the north by Ellerslie Road (9 Ave SW), on the west by 66 Street SW, and on the east by 50 Street SW. To the south is an undeveloped rural area of Edmonton. In the future, the southern boundary will be 25 Avenue SW.

Demographics 
In the City of Edmonton's 2012 municipal census, Walker had a population of  living in  dwellings.

Surrounding neighbourhoods

References 

Neighbourhoods in Edmonton